Emre Zafer Barnes, (born Winston Barnes on 7 November 1988) is a Jamaica-born Turkish sprinter.Barnes won the 100 m race at the 2015 Salzburg Athletics Gala in Austria. Also at 2021 Islamic Solidarity Games he was awarded third place while he was in 4th place due to photo finish mistakes.

By July 2015, he switched allegiance to  Turkey, and adopted the Turkish given name Emre Zafer. In his first season in Turkey, Barnes was the member of the team, which set a new Turkish record in 4 × 100 m relay in Erzurum.

He competed in the 100 m event at the 2016 Ricardo Romo Invitational of University of Texas at San Antonio, USA, and earned a quota spot for the 2016 Summer Olympics with his performance.

Competition record
Following contains competitions with medal wins only:

References

External links

1988 births
Jamaican male sprinters
Jamaican emigrants to Turkey
Naturalized citizens of Turkey
Turkish male sprinters
Living people
Athletes (track and field) at the 2016 Summer Olympics
Athletes (track and field) at the 2020 Summer Olympics
Olympic athletes of Turkey
World Athletics Championships athletes for Turkey
Athletes (track and field) at the 2018 Mediterranean Games
Mediterranean Games silver medalists for Turkey
Mediterranean Games medalists in athletics
Olympic male sprinters
People from Spanish Town